Dirk Richter (born 12 September 1964) is a former swimmer from East Germany, who won the bronze medal in the 4×100 freestyle medley twice during the Summer Olympics. He did so in 1988 with the East German team, alongside Thomas Flemming, Lars Hinneburg, and Steffen Zesner.

Four years later, when Barcelona, Spain hosted the Games, Richter represented Germany and ended up third alongside Mark Pinger, Christian Tröger, and Steffen Zesner.

References

External links

1964 births
Living people
Sportspeople from Cottbus
People from Bezirk Cottbus
German male swimmers
Male backstroke swimmers
Olympic swimmers of East Germany
Olympic swimmers of Germany
Swimmers at the 1988 Summer Olympics
Swimmers at the 1992 Summer Olympics
Olympic bronze medalists for East Germany
Olympic bronze medalists for Germany
Olympic bronze medalists in swimming
German male freestyle swimmers
World Aquatics Championships medalists in swimming
European Aquatics Championships medalists in swimming
Medalists at the 1992 Summer Olympics
Medalists at the 1988 Summer Olympics